Nigel Hargreaves Northridge (born January 1956) is a British businessman, the chairman of Hogg Robinson Group since April 2016, and was the chairman of the British multinational department store chain, Debenhams from April 2010 to April 2016.

Early life
Nigel Hargreaves Northridge was born in January 1956. He was educated at Sullivan Upper School, Belfast, followed by an HND in business studies from Northern Ireland Polytechnic.

Career
Northridge worked for Gallaher Group for 32 years, rising to chief executive, from 2000 to 2007.

Northridge was the chairman of the British multinational department store chain, Debenhams from April 2010 to April 2016, when he was succeeded by Sir Ian Cheshire.

Northridge has been the chairman of Hogg Robinson Group since April 2016, following John Coombe's retirement.

He is a non-executive director at Inchcape and is a non-executive director, and the vice chairman of Scandinavian Tobacco Group. He has been a non-executive director of Aggreko, Thomas Cook Group, and Aer Lingus.

References

1956 births
British businesspeople
Living people
Alumni of Ulster University
People educated at Sullivan Upper School